Fédération Anarchiste (Anarchist Federation) is an anarchist federation in France, Belgium and Switzerland. It is a member of the International of Anarchist Federations since the latter's establishment in 1968.

History 
The Fédération anarchiste (FA) was founded in Paris on December 2, 1945, and elected Georges Fontenis as its first secretary the next year. It was composed of a majority of activists from a former incarnation of the FA (which supported Voline's Synthesis) and some members of the former Union anarchiste, which backed CNT-FAI support for the Republican government during the Spanish Civil War. A youth organization of the FA (the Jeunesses libertaires) was also created.

In 1950, a clandestine group formed within the FA called Organisation Pensée Bataille (OPB), led by Georges Fontenis. The OPB pushed for a move which saw the FA change its name to the Fédération communiste libertaire (FCL) after the 1953 Congress in Paris, while an article in Le Libertaire indicated the end of the cooperation with the French Surrealist group led by André Breton. The FCL regrouped with between 130 and 160 activists. The new decision making process was founded on unanimity: each person has a right of veto on the orientations of the federation. The FCL published the same year the Manifeste du communisme libertaire. The FCL published its 'workers’ program' in 1954, which was heavily inspired by the CGT's revendications. The Internationale communiste libertaire (ICL), which groups the Italian GAAP, the Spanish Ruta and the Mouvement libertaire nord-africain (MLNA, North African Libertarian Movement), was founded to replace the Anarchist International, deemed too reformist. The first issue of the monthly Monde libertaire, the news organ of the FA which would be published until 1977, came out in October 1954.

Several groups quit the FCL in December 1955, disagreeing with the decision to present "revolutionary candidates" to the legislative elections. On August 15–20, 1954, the Ve intercontinental plenum of the CNT took place. A group called Entente anarchiste appeared which was formed of militants who didn't like the new ideological orientation that the OPB was giving the FCL seeing it was authoritarian and almost Marxist. The FCL lasted until 1956 just after it participated in state legislative elections with 10 candidates. This move alienated some members of the FCL and thus produced the end of the organization.

A group of militants who didn't agree with the FA turning into FCL reorganized a new Federation Anarchiste which was established in December 1953. This included those who formed L´Entente anarchiste who joined the new FA and then dissolved L´Entente. The new base principles of the FA were written by Charles-Auguste Bontemps and Maurice Joyeux which established an organization with a plurality of tendencies and autonomy of federated groups organized around synthesist principles. According to historian Cédric Guérin, "the unconditional rejection of marxism became from that moment onwards an identity element of the new Federation Anarchiste" and this was motivated in a big part after the previous conflict with Georges Fontenis and his OPB. Also it was decided to establish within the organization a Committee of Relations composed of a General Secretary, a Secretary of Internal Relations, a Secretary of External Relations a Committee of Redaction of Le Monde Libertaire and a Committee of Administration. On 1955 a Commission on Syndicalist Relations was established within the FA as proposed by anarcho-syndicalist members.

In 1968, the International of Anarchist Federations was founded during an international anarchist conference in Carrara in 1968 by the three existing European federations of the French FA, the Italian Federazione Anarchica Italiana and the Iberian Anarchist Federation as well as the Bulgarian federation in French exile.

In the 1970s the FA evolved into a joining of the principles of both synthesis anarchism and platformism. Today the FA is constituted of about one hundred groups around the country. It publishes the weekly Le Monde libertaire and runs a radio station called Radio libertaire.

See also 
 Anarchism in France
 Italian Anarchist Federation

References

External links 

 Fédération anarchiste official webpage
 Radio Libertaire on the internet
 Info Libertaire

Anarchist organizations in France
Anarchism in Belgium
Organizations established in 1945
1945 establishments in France
French Anarchist Federations
International of Anarchist Federations